Take Me to the Moon is a 2017 Taiwanese romance film directed by Hsieh Chun-yi. The film stars Jasper Liu, Vivian Sung, Vera Yen, Shih Chih-tian, Pipi Yao and Lee Chuan. It was released in theaters on December 1, 2017.

Premise
Cheng-hsiang reunites with the members of his high school band and reminisces about their lead singer and his past love, En-pei, whose pursuit of her dreams ended in tragedy. He regrets having encouraged her to pursue her dreams all those years ago, wondering if she wouldn't have died if he hadn't done so. Drunk after the memorial and hit by a vehicle, Cheng-hsiang is miraculously transported back to the past, where he sets out to stop En-pei from making the same mistake.

Cast
 Jasper Liu as Wang Cheng-hsiang 
 Vivian Sung as Li En-pei
 Vera Yen as Hsiao-ba
 Shih Chih-tian as Da-bao
 Pipi Yao as Hsiao-fen
 Lee Chuan as Sheng 
 Lu Hsueh-feng as Flower vendor
 Irene Luo as Ms. Chen
 Yuki Daki as Mr. Chen
 Kelly Kuo as En-pei's mother
 Yang Li-yin as Cheng-hsiang's mother
 Pu Hsueh-liang as Cheng-hsiang's father
 Landy Wen as Ruby
 Birdman C as Chang Yu-sheng

Production
Filming began in September 2016.

The title of the film is a tribute to the song "Take Me to the Moon" by Chang Yu-sheng, which featured on the soundtrack of the film.

Reception

Box office
Domestically, it received lukewarm response, the film grossed $14.6 million NTD, making it the top 12 Taiwanese film of 2017 and attracted a total of 67,0154 audience.

In Korea, it was released under the title of "Hi, My Girl (안녕, 나의 소녀)" and attracted a total of 111,541 audience, a higher following than domestic records, making it the 3rd highest grossing Taiwanese Film in Korea of all time. The film made Jasper Liu even more popular in Korea.

References

External links
 

2017 films
Films about time travel
Films set in 1997
2010s romantic musical films
Taiwanese romantic musical films
2010s Mandarin-language films